Knutton is a village in the Borough of Newcastle-under-Lyme, Staffordshire, England. It lies between the town of Newcastle-under-Lyme, and the village of Silverdale.

References

Newcastle-under-Lyme